ACAM may refer to:

Atlantic Canada Aviation Museum
American Classic Arcade Museum